Keanu Reeves (born 1964) is a Canadian actor.

Keanu may also refer to:

 Keanu (film), a 2016 American comedy film

People
 Keanu Asing (born 1993), American surfer 
 Keanu Baccus (born 1998), Australian soccer player
 Keanu Marsh-Brown (born 1992), English footballer
 Keanu Neal (born 1995), American football player
 Keanu Pinder (born 1995), Australian basketball player
 Keanu Staude (born 1997), German soccer player
 Keanu Vers (born 1996), South African rugby union footballer

Fictional characters
 Keanu Taylor, a fictional character from the British soap opera EastEnders

See also

 
 
 "Keanu Reeves" (song), a 2019 single by Logic
 "Keanu Reeves Reply", a 2004 song by Fiona Sit off the album 'F' Debut